Serkan Çayoğlu (born 31 May 1987) is a German born Turkish actor, known for his role in Kiraz Mevsimi, and Halka.

Early life and education 
Serkan Çayoğlu was born on 31 May 1987 in Germany to a Turkish family. He completed his education in Erlangen University's Economics department in Germany. While studying at university, he also started to work as a model.

Career 
Çayoğlu, who came to Istanbul to become an actor, received acting lessons from Ümit Çırak and Dolunay Soysert at Ümit Çırak's Modern Acting Techniques Atelier. In 2012, he started his acting career by playing the friend of Merve Boluğur's character from Italy in the season finale of Kuzey Güney. He also played in Hande Yener's "Ya Ya Ya" music video in 2013. Çayoğlu started to be known with Kiraz Mevsimi as Ayaz.

Personal life 
On 14 July 2022, Çayoğlu and his longtime girlfriend Özge Gürel married in Germany. Family and close friends attended the intimate ceremony.

Filmography

Television

Cinema

Awards and nominations

References

1987 births
Living people
Turkish male television actors
Turkish male film actors
Erlangen University alumni